Woerner is a surname. Notable people with the surname include:

Carrie Woerner, American politician
Charlie Woerner (born 1997), American football player
Frederick F. Woerner Jr. (born 1933), American general
K. Woerner, American gymnast
Klaus Woerner (1939–2005), Canadian businessman
Marlene Woerner (1918–2010), German sculptor
Scott Woerner (born 1958), American football player

See also
Woerner Field
Louis and Elizabeth Woerner House
Worner (disambiguation)